Towanda is a borough and the county seat of Bradford County in the U.S. state of Pennsylvania. The name means "burial ground" in the Algonquian language. As of the 2020 census, the population of Towanda was 2,833.

History
Towanda was settled in 1784 and became the county seat in 1812. It was variously known for some years
as Meansville, Overton, Williamson, Monmouth and Towanda, and incorporated in 1828. Towanda was once known primarily for its industrial interests, which included flour, planing and silk mills, a foundry and machine shop, dye works, and manufacturers of talking machines, cut glass, toys and furniture. The population in 1900 was 4,663 and 4,281 in 1910.

The Towanda Historic District and Bradford County Courthouse are listed on the National Register of Historic Places. The Pennsylvania Guide, compiled by the Writers' Program of the Works Progress Administration, described Towanda in 1940 as:

Geography
Towanda is located near the center of Bradford County at  (41.770251, −76.446545), at approximately 730 ft. above sea level, on the west bank of the Susquehanna River. It is bordered to the north and west by North Towanda Township, to the south and west by Towanda Township, and to the east, across the river, by Wysox Township.

U.S. Route 220 bypasses the borough to the west and leads north  to its terminus at Waverly, New York and southwest  to Williamsport.

Climate
Towanda has a humid continental climate, with cold winters and warm to hot summers.

Demographics

As of the 2000 census, there were 3,024 people, 1,279 households and 795 families residing in the borough. The racial makeup of the borough was 96.36% White, 0.86% African American, 0.36% Native American, 1.19% Asian, 0.13% from other races, and 1.09% from two or more races. Hispanic or Latino of any race were 1.19% of the population.

There were 1,279 households, of which 30.5% had children under the age of 18 living with them, 43.6% were married couples living together, 13.4% had a female householder with no husband present, and 37.8% were non-families. 31.7% of all households were made up of individuals, and 12.7% had someone living alone who was 65 years of age or older. The average household size was 2.32 and the average family size was 2.92.

Age distribution was 25.1% under the age of 18, 7.7% from 18 to 24, 28.3% from 25 to 44, 22.4% from 45 to 64, and 16.6% who were 65 years of age or older. The median age was 38 years. For every 100 females, there were 92.0 males. For every 100 females age 18 and over, there were 85.9 males. The median household income was $35,814, and the median family income was $41,884. Males had a median income of $35,663 versus $23,796 for females. The per capita income for the borough was $17,438. About 9.9% of families and 13.4% of the population were below the poverty line, including 19.5% of those under age 18 and 4.0% of those age 65 or over.

Education
Towanda is home to Lackawanna College Towanda Center, a private, accredited two-year college serving Northeastern Pennsylvania and its satellite campus of Lackawanna College in Scranton.

Government
Towanda has a council–manager form of government.

Notable people

 Jean Brenchley, microbiologist
 Nate Bump, relief pitcher for the Florida Marlins
 Mike Conley, boxer
 Edward T. Fairchild, Chief Justice of the Wisconsin Supreme Court
 Wilson D. Gillette, U.S. Congressman from Pennsylvania
 William W. Kingsbury, U.S. Delegate from Minnesota Territory
 Gregory La Cava, film director (My Man Godfrey, Stage Door)
 Roger A. Madigan, Pennsylvania state legislator
 Tina Pickett, Pennsylvania state legislator
 Charlotte Porter, co-founder and co-editor of Poet Lore
 Julia H. Scott (1809–1842), poet
 Sabra Wilbur Vought (1877–1942), librarian
 Charles M. Webb, Wisconsin jurist and politician
 Paul D. Webb, Cartoonist for Esquire, LIFE, Collier's, and The Saturday Evening Post.
 David Wilmot, U.S. Senator and Congressman from Pennsylvania
 J. Nielsen, Judge on Forged in Fire on the History Channel

References

External links
Borough of Towanda official website
Towanda Online, local guide
The Daily Review, local newspaper

County seats in Pennsylvania
Populated places established in 1784
Pennsylvania populated places on the Susquehanna River
Boroughs in Bradford County, Pennsylvania
1828 establishments in Pennsylvania